Rubus hirtus is a species of flowering plant in the Rubus section (the blackberries) of the genus Rubus, family Rosaceae. It is native to most of southern and central Europe, as well as Belarus, Ukraine, the Caucasus and Turkey. A woodland species, its distribution largely corresponds to that of the beeches Fagus sylvatica and the closely related F.orientalis.

References

hirtus
Flora of Spain
Flora of France
Flora of Corsica
Flora of Sardinia
Flora of Central Europe
Flora of Southeastern Europe
Flora of Belarus
Flora of Ukraine
Flora of the Crimean Peninsula
Flora of the Caucasus
Flora of Turkey
Plants described in 1805